The Yanqing National Alpine Ski Centre is a Chinese alpine ski resort in Yanqing District, a suburban district in Beijing. It opened in 2019. It is 90 km (55 mi) northwest from the urban center of Beijing. 

It is the venue for all, speed and technical, both men's and women's alpine skiing events for the 2022 Winter Olympics.

History 
The centre was constructed as part of the Yanqing cluster of 2022 Winter Olympics venues, alongside the Yanqing National Sliding Centre. 

It opened in 2019. It planned to host a FIS Alpine Ski World Cup meet in February 2020, but it was cancelled due to the COVID-19 pandemic in China.

Facilities 

It has trails totaling , including seven racing courses with inclines up to 68%, among the steepest in the world. 

The region has little natural snowfall, so most of the resort's snow is generated artificially.

Olympic courses

Men

Women

References

External links 
Yanqing Ski Resort skiresort.info

Venues of the 2022 Winter Olympics
Ski areas and resorts in China